The 3rd Marine Aircraft Wing (abbreviated as 3rd MAW) is the major west coast aviation unit of the United States Marine Corps. It is headquartered at Marine Corps Air Station Miramar, in San Diego, California and provides the aviation combat element for I Marine Expeditionary Force.  The wing is made up of a headquarters squadron, four flying groups, an aviation command and control group and an aviation engineering group.

Mission
Provide combat ready expeditionary aviation forces capable of short notice worldwide deployment to Marine Air-Ground Task Force (MAGTF), fleet and unified commanders.

Current force

Locations

Units of 3rd MAW are located in the western United States at the following bases:
 Marine Corps Air Station Miramar
 Marine Corps Air Station Yuma
 Marine Corps Base Camp Pendleton
 Marine Corps Air Ground Combat Center Twentynine Palms

Subordinate units
 Marine Aircraft Group 11
 Marine Aircraft Group 13
 Marine Aircraft Group 16
 Marine Aircraft Group 39
 Marine Air Control Group 38
 Marine Wing Headquarters Squadron 3
 3rd MAW Band

History

World War II
3rd Marine Aircraft Wing was commissioned on November 10, 1942, at Marine Corps Air Station Cherry Point, North Carolina, with a personnel roster of 13 officers, 25 enlisted men and one aircraft, a trainer.

The Wing's combat history began with the World War II deployment of a bomber squadron on December 3, 1943. A little more than a year later, the Wing deployed a night fighter squadron in support of the war effort.

In early April 1944, the wing turned over its training duties and assigned units to the 9th Marine Aircraft Wing and on April 21, 1944, boarded three carriers USS Gambier Bay CVE-73, USS Hoggat Bay CVE-75, and USS Kitkun Bay CVE-71  for a voyage to Hawaii and arrived May 8, where it assumed the functions of Marine Air, Hawaii Area (MAHA).

When the Japanese surrendered, 3rd MAW was decommissioned on December 31, 1945, at Marine Corps Air Station Ewa and its personnel were assigned to other units. The Wing also played an important, but behind-the-scenes, role during the war by training Marine pilots and support personnel for combat duty overseas.

1950s

In 1952, as the Marine Corps again fought in the Far East, the Wing was reactivated at MCAS Cherry Point for the Korean War. The main portion of the wing began moving to the new Marine Corps Air Station Miami, the Marine Corps' first "flying field."

In September 1955, the Wing left MCAS Miami for Marine Corps Air Station El Toro, California.  3rd MAW  was rebuilt again, with the addition of Marine Aircraft Group 15, followed by Marine Aircraft Group 36 on September 5, 1955, with its helicopter squadrons at the nearby Marine Corps Air Facility Santa Ana, later renamed Marine Corps Air Station Tustin.

Vietnam War through the 1980s

Wing squadrons were detached and deployed to Vietnam as combat action in Southeast Asia flared. At the end of the Vietnam War several units were brought back to the United States and deactivated or redesignated, creating 3rd Marine Aircraft Wing as it is constituted today.

The Gulf War and the 1990s

The wing saw action again as part of I Marine Expeditionary Force (I MEF), conducting operations in Iraq and Kuwait during Operation Desert Storm.  It deployed over 40 squadrons of aircraft, flew over 18,000 sorties while operating from 6 airfields throughout the theater. After the end of hostilities, 3rd MAW aircraft provided support in Operation Provide Comfort and Operation Southern Watch over Iraq. The wing was once more called into service in Somalia for Operation Restore Hope.  In 1999, 3rd MAW relocated to Marine Corps Air Station Miramar, California.

Global War on Terror

The fall of 2001 saw the beginning of the War on Terrorism, and 3rd MAW since deployed several detachments in support of the ongoing Operation Enduring Freedom in Afghanistan.

In the fall of 2002, the wing began deploying to Kuwait to prepare for combat operations in Iraq.  Ultimately the wing moved 435 aircraft and 15,451 personnel to Southwest Asia prior to the attack marking the first time the entire wing had deployed since the Gulf War and the largest since the Vietnam War.  Their two primary bases in Kuwait were Ali Al Salem Air Base and Ahmad al-Jaber Air Base while Wing ground units also established 15 Forward Operating Bases (FOBs) or Forward Arming and Refueling Points (FARPs) during march north.  During the invasion, 3rd MAW expended over 6 million pounds of ordnance, including over 2,300 general-purpose bombs and 2,200 precision guided munitions.

Current aircraft in use
Fixed-wing aircraft
 F/A-18 Hornet
 F-35B Lightning II
 AV-8B Harrier II
 KC-130J Super Hercules

Rotary-wing aircraft
 AH-1W SuperCobra
 AH-1Z Viper
 UH-1Y Venom
 CH-53E Super Stallion

Tiltrotor aircraft
 MV-22B Osprey

UAVs
 RQ-7 Shadow
 Scan Eagle

See also

 List of United States Marine Corps aircraft groups
 List of United States Marine Corps aircraft squadrons
 United States Marine Corps Aviation

References

Citations

Bibliography

 
 
 
 
 
 

Web

 Official 3rd MAW's official website

1c
Military units and formations in California
Military units and formations of the United States Marine Corps in World War II